Visitors to Niger must obtain a visa from one of the Nigerien diplomatic missions unless they come from one of the visa exempt countries.

Visa policy map

Visa exemption 

Citizens of the following 19 countries or regions can visit Niger without a visa:

Holders of diplomatic passports issued to nationals of China, Cuba, Italy, Turkey and United Arab Emirates do not require a visa for Niger.

Transit without a visa
Transit without a visa is available to holders of onward tickets for a maximum transit of 24 hours - except for nationals of Albania, Armenia, Azerbaijan, Belarus, Bosnia and Herzegovina, Bulgaria, China, Croatia, Czech Republic, Georgia, Hungary, Kazakhstan, Democratic People's Republic of Korea (North Korea), Kyrgyzstan, Moldova, Mongolia, North Macedonia,  Poland, Portugal, Romania, Russia, Slovakia, Slovenia, South Africa, Tajikistan, Turkmenistan, Ukraine, Uzbekistan and Vietnam who may transit without a visa only if proceeding by the same aircraft.

Visa On Arrival
Holders of a pre-approved confirmation from the National Police may obtain a visa on arrival (flyer visa) upon arrival at Niamey. The passport will be compounded for 1 working day and the traveler is required to appear at the Director General of Immigration the next working day to register and collect their passport.

See also

Visa requirements for Nigerien citizens

References

Niger
Foreign relations of Niger